is a 1965 Japanese romantic war drama film directed by Seijun Suzuki. It is based on a story by Taijiro Tamura who, like Suzuki, had served as a soldier in the war.

Plot
Disappointed by the marriage of her lover to a woman he does not love, prostitute Harumi drifts from the city to a remote Japanese outpost in Manchuria to work in a "comfort house," or brothel, during the Sino-Japanese War. The commanding adjutant there takes an immediate liking to the new girl, but she is fascinated by and comes to love Mikami, the officer's aide. At first he is haughty and indifferent to the girl, which enrages her, but they are eventually drawn together. Abused and manipulated by the adjutant, she grows to hate the officer and seeks solace in Mikami's arms. They carry on a clandestine affair, which is a dangerous breach of code for both of them.

Tragedy strikes when Chinese guerrillas attack the outpost and Mikami is severely wounded in a trench. Harumi runs to him and they are both captured by the enemy while he is unconscious. The Chinese dress his wounds and he is given the opportunity to withdraw with them as a prisoner of war. Mikami refuses their offer, stating he is duty-bound not to be captured at all, and only Harumi's intervention prevents him from killing himself. Once again in the custody of the Japanese, Harumi is sent back to the brothel, and Mikami is to be court-martialed and executed in disgrace. Harumi begs the adjutant for mercy, but he has none. During another attack on the outpost, Mikami escapes with Harumi's aid, but instead of fleeing with her, he decides to blow himself up to restore his and his battalion's honor. She leaps on him and they die together.

Cast
 Yumiko Nogawa as Harumi
 Tamio Kawachi as Pvt. Shinkichi Mikami
 Isao Tamagawa as Lt. Narita
 Jūkei Fujioka as Kimura
 Shoichi Ozawa as Sgt. Akiyama

Production
In 1950, Tamura's story was made into a more romantic film, Escape at Dawn, co-written by Akira Kurosawa and directed by Senkichi Taniguchi. For the Nikkatsu adaptation, Suzuki drew upon his firsthand experience at the wartime front to portray the conditions and behavior in a more realistic light. What was presented in the film and the actual conditions "probably aren't that different," Suzuki said in a 2005 interview. Most Japanese war movies portrayed the era with healthy doses of tragedy, but Suzuki infused an air of ludicrousness in his film. His own opinion of the wartime military experience was that beside the brutality, it was "extremely comical and absurd."

Suzuki could not film on location in China, so studio sets and lookalike locations in Japan were used.

Themes and analysis
The manner in which Suzuki portrays Harumi and her quintessential role in the narrative makes Story of a Prostitute a female empowerment film. Although the history in Suzuki’s film is oftentimes underdeveloped or exaggerated, this theme is very evident in the narrative. Important to note would be the circumstances in which Harumi entered the comfort women system in Japan. Interestingly, she was not solicited, coerced, or forcefully taken by the military or an affiliated party, as were the most common cases of the majority of Japanese comfort women. Rather, Harumi left the Chinese city of Tianjin and entered the comfort women system as a volunteer, after her Japanese lover abandons her.

“So her immediate decision to volunteer as a comfort woman, which is prostitution on the assembly-line model, is an inverted gesture of revenge, as if to say, ‘He’ll be sorry when he finds out what I’ve done.’” Although Suzuki’s decision to make Harumi a volunteer assists the construction of her character and adds more drama to the narrative, “cases in which women became comfort women of their own free will were rare.”

Harumi is depicted as an attentive and sharp-witted woman, the predominant driving force of the narrative. The influence she maintained as a comfort woman at a Japanese outpost in Manchuria is incredible, although somewhat exaggerated. In fact, without Harumi’s convincing, Mikami would have committed suicide once captured by Chinese forces due to his “unquestioning devotion to the emperor, ” an unfortunate characteristic in every imperial Japanese soldier. The amount of sway Harumi holds in the narrative and the ways in which she communicates with all members of the Japanese army are heavily exaggerated and historically inaccurate. Historians widely acknowledge that comfort women in Japan had very little say, if any at all, in how they were treated or the conditions they found themselves in- “‘Military comfort women’ were women restrained for a certain period with no rights, under the control of the Japanese military, and forced to engage in sexual activity with Japanese military personnel.” Suzuki does not seem to be preoccupied with maintaining historical accuracy and the minuscule amount of power comfort women held, as Harumi’s actions are a clear contradiction to history. While this is certainly not to say that comfort women were not tenacious as they would attempt to fight back against their oppressors, they were not able to truly exercise their power or voices until the 1990s, many years after the comfort women system was abolished. It was not until five decades after World War II did past Korean comfort women come forth and share their dreadful experiences being physically and mentally abused by the Japanese military.

Story of a Prostitute does not take into account the complexities of comfort women from different countries, as the Japanese military and affiliated parties solicited women from Korea, Taiwan, China, and numerous other territories. In a journal article published in 1994, Bill Mihalopoulos explains the historical silencing of women and overlooking of the cultures which comfort women originated- “I do not contest concepts of women as an oppressed group, but I do take seriously the historical and geographical differences between women within what is usually unified as a single culture.” In Suzuki’s film, no attention is given to the different treatment of comfort women related to their ethnicities. One may even forget that Harumi is from Tianjin, China, as so little information about her background and entry into the Japanese comfort women system is given.

Aside from the development of Harumi’s character, Suzuki’s depiction of the Japanese military outpost and the living conditions of comfort women are also not incredibly historically accurate. In the first quarter of the film, Harumi and some additional comfort women casually talk amongst themselves and with lower-ranking soldiers. These interactions are both cordial and informal, which would have never taken place under the strict army supervision of comfort women. Under the unyielding supervision of comfort stations, it also seems implausible that Harumi and Mikami would have been able to secretly meet in an unoccupied space just minutes after Harumi slept with Lt. Narita, as “outings by prostitutes [were] forbidden.” While their relationship is the focal point of Suzuki’s narrative, the circumstances under which it developed are not historically accurate.

Reception
At this time, Suzuki was at regular odds with Nikkatsu, his studio. He would be given a project and expected to direct it in workmanlike fashion, but he consistently introduced stylistic nuances and levels of realism that the studio resented.

Suzuki didn't at first get critical attention as a "B-movie director." By 1965, some critics began to take note of his style, but this film had very mixed reviews, mostly disappointing. In this case, the first version of Tamura's story was chaste (the girls were "entertainers," not "comfort women") and romantically inclined, and Suzuki portrayed a far more realistic portrait of the ugly side of Japanese military life. Critic Tadao Sato noted that most films portray the very meditative and serene traditions that Japanese are known for, but Suzuki also dramatizes "another tradition that is the complete opposite ... very disorderly and grotesque." This and the realistic onscreen depiction of sexuality and sadism didn't win over audiences.

Release

Home media
Story of a Prostitute has been released on DVD as part of The Criterion Collection.

References

External links
 
 
 Story of a Prostitute  at the Japanese Movie Database
Story of a Prostitute an essay by David Chute at the Criterion Collection

1965 romantic drama films
1960s war drama films
1960s Japanese-language films
1965 films
1965 war films
Films set in the 1930s
Japanese black-and-white films
Films about prostitution in China
Films based on Japanese novels
Films set in Manchukuo
Films directed by Seijun Suzuki
Japanese war drama films
Japanese World War II films
Second Sino-Japanese War films
1960s Japanese films